D. Damodar Rao  is an  Indian politician and a member of the Rajya Sabha, upper house of the Parliament of India from Telangana as a member of the Telangana Rashtra Samithi.

References 

Telangana Rashtra Samithi
Living people
Year of birth missing (living people)
Rajya Sabha members from Telangana